Coprolactistus is a genus of bird mites in the family Macronyssidae. There is at least one described species in Coprolactistus, C. whitakeri.

References

Mesostigmata
Articles created by Qbugbot